Bolton Muslim Girls' School is a secondary school located in Bolton in the English county of Greater Manchester.

It was founded in 1987 as a private Islamic school for girls by Bolton Muslim Welfare Trust. In 2007 it became a voluntary aided school and part of the state-funded sector administered by Bolton Metropolitan Borough Council. In September 2016 the school converted to academy status. The school is now sponsored by the Prosper Multi-Academy Trust.

Bolton Muslim Girls' School offers GCSEs and BTECs as programmes of study for pupils.

References

External links
Muslim Girls' School official website

Secondary schools in the Metropolitan Borough of Bolton
Girls' schools in Greater Manchester
Islamic schools in England
Educational institutions established in 1987
1987 establishments in England
Academies in the Metropolitan Borough of Bolton